Ryan Belal (born 4 October 1988) is a football player, who plays as a striker .

He joined Al-Nasr in the summer of 2007, having left the Ohod club of Medina. He is nicknamed the "Maradona of the Desert", because he scored By hand in the Saudi League 2011/2012 season.

References

kooora.com - Arabic
Maradona of Riyadh, Ryan Bilal Scored By Hand

1988 births
Living people
People from Medina
Association football forwards
Saudi Arabian footballers
Saudi Arabia youth international footballers
Saudi Arabia international footballers
Ohod Club players
Al Nassr FC players
Al-Qadsiah FC players
Al-Raed FC players
Al-Faisaly FC players
Al-Taawoun FC players
Ettifaq FC players
Al-Ansar FC (Medina) players
Wej SC players
Al-Najma SC players
Al-Anwar Club players
Saudi First Division League players
Saudi Professional League players
Saudi Second Division players
Saudi Fourth Division players
Saudi Third Division players